Zygoruellia richardii is a species of flowering plant in the family Acanthaceae. It is endemic to Madagascar. The monotypic genus and species were first formally named in 1890 by French botanist Henri Ernest Baillon. It is the only species in the genus Zygoruellia.

References

Acanthaceae
Endemic flora of Madagascar
Acanthaceae genera
Monotypic Lamiales genera